WSGT (107.1 MHz) is a Classic Hits formatted broadcast radio station licensed to Patterson, Georgia, serving Waycross and Jesup in Georgia.  WSGT is owned and operated by John Higgs' Broadcast South, through licensee Higgs Multimedia Group, LLC.

References

External links
Kool 107.1 Online

2012 establishments in Georgia (U.S. state)
Classic hits radio stations in the United States
Radio stations established in 2012
SGT